Victor Irineu de Souza (born 3 April 1989), or simply Victor, is a Brazilian former footballer.

Career
In September 2007, he left for Monza from Villa Nova.
In January 2008, he was loaned to Pescara and in June 2008 the deal became permanent. After played two Coppa Italia matches, he was loaned to Lecce on 1 September 2008 but released by Pescara in July 2009. He was then trailed at Serie D side Colognese Calcio.

In January 2010, he left for Frosinone.

References

External links 
 
 
 CBF profile

1989 births
Living people
Footballers from Belo Horizonte
Brazilian footballers
Brazilian expatriate footballers
People with acquired Italian citizenship
A.C. Monza players
Delfino Pescara 1936 players
U.S. Lecce players
Frosinone Calcio players
FC Amkar Perm players
Russian Premier League players
Serie B players
Expatriate footballers in Russia
Brazilian expatriate sportspeople in Russia
Expatriate footballers in Sweden
Brazilian expatriate sportspeople in Sweden
Association football forwards